Hot Tracks may refer to:
Hot Tracks (album), the 1976 album by Nazareth
Several song ranking lists published by Billboard magazine:
Hot Rap Tracks 
Hot Digital Tracks 
Hot Adult Contemporary Tracks 
Hot Latin Tracks
Hot Gospel Tracks
New York Hot Tracks, an American television series from 1983 to 1989
Hot Tracks, a DJ remix service